Ghindărești (formerly Ghizdărești) is a commune in Constanța County, Northern Dobruja, Romania, including the village with the same name.

Demographics
At the 2011 census, 94.5% of inhabitants (1,865) were Russians or Lipovans and 2.2% (43) Romanians. At the 2002 census, 95.9% were Lipovan Orthodox and 3.7% Romanian Orthodox.

Natives
Ionel Melinte

References

Communes in Constanța County
Localities in Northern Dobruja
Populated places on the Danube